Abarghan (also Romanized as Abarghān, Āberghān, and Abraghan; also known as Āvargān, Avarkān, Āvergān, Avergian, and Avergyan) is a village in Dowlatabad Rural District, in the Central District of Marand County, East Azerbaijan Province, Iran. At the 2006 census, its population was 2,184, in 505 families.

References 

Populated places in Marand County